Robin Elizabeth Wells (born 1959) is an American economist. She is the co-author of several economics texts, mostly with her husband Paul Krugman.

Life and career
Wells received her BA from the University of Chicago and her PhD from the University of California, Berkeley. After obtaining her PhD degree in economics from UC Berkeley, Wells obtained a post-doctoral fellowship at the Massachusetts Institute of Technology. She has taught or done research at the University of Michigan, the University of Southampton, Stanford University, MIT, and Princeton University.

Wells is the co-author of several economics books with her husband, economist Paul Krugman, Macroeconomics and Microeconomics, that rank in the top selling economics textbooks used in U.S. colleges today. For The Occupy Handbook, Wells served as guest editor and contributed an original article.  She is a frequent writer for The Guardian online, has published articles in economics journals, and has blogged for The Huffington Post.  With her husband, she has co-authored both articles and book reviews for The New York Review of Books. Wells teaches Forrest Yoga in Princeton, New Jersey.

Selected bibliography
Economics: European Edition (Spring 2007), Paul Krugman, Robin Wells, and Kathryn Graddy. 
Macroeconomics (February 2006), Paul Krugman and Robin Wells. 
Economics (December 2005), Paul Krugman and Robin Wells. 
Microeconomics (March 2004), Paul Krugman and Robin Wells. 
The Occupy Handbook (April 2012), edited by Janet Byrne.

References

External links
Biographical sketch, Huffington Post
Biographical sketch, Worth Publishers

1959 births
American women economists
Living people
University of Michigan faculty
21st-century American economists
21st-century American women